VIA EPIA (VIA Embedded Platform Innovative Architecture) is a series of mini-ITX, em-ITX, nano-ITX, pico-ITX and pico-ITXe motherboards with integrated VIA processors. They are small and consume less power than computers of comparable capabilities.

Model codes
The VIA EPIA motherboards have the following designators:

Pico-ITX

EPIA PX 

 Processor: 1× VIA C7 with 1000 MHz
 Chipset: VIA VX700 Unified Digital Media IGP chipset
 Main memory: 1 DDR2-533 SO-DIMM socket (max. 1024 MB)
 Miscellaneous:
 1× ATA
 1× Serial ATA
 1× LVDS / DVI connector
 7.1 HD audio

All connections apart from the VGA and network connection are only onboard for reasons of space.

Nano-ITX

EPIA N 

 Processor: 1× Luke CoreFusion with 500, 800 or 1,000 MHz
 Chipset: Luke CoreFusion (integrated VIA CN400 Northbridge) + VIA VT8237R Southbridge
 Main memory: 1× DDR-SDRAM as SO-DIMM (PC3200, PC2700, PC2100 and PC1600)
 Miscellaneous:
 1× Mini PCI
 1× Serial ATA
 1× LVDS connector
 1× S-Video
 1× RCA (for S/PDIF or Composite)

EPIA NL 

 Processor: 1× Luke CoreFusion with 500, 800 or 1,000 MHz
 Chipset: Luke CoreFusion (integrated VIA CN400 Northbridge) + VIA VT8237R Southbridge
 Main memory: 1× DDR-SDRAM as SO-DIMM (PC3200, PC2700, PC2100 and PC1600)
 Miscellaneous:
 encryption unit
 1× Mini PCI
 1× Serial ATA
 1× LVDS connector

Mini-ITX

EPIA 

 Processor: 1× VIA C3 (800 MHz) or 1× EDEN ESP (533 MHz)
 Chipset: VIA PLE133T north bridge + VIA VT8231 south bridge
 Main memory: 2× SDR-SDRAM (PC100 and PC133)
 Miscellaneous:
 1× S-Video
 1× RCA (for S/PDIF or Composite)

EPIA CL 

 Processor: 1× VIA C3 (1000 MHz) or 1× EDEN ESP (600 MHz)
 Chipset: VIA CLE266 north bridge + VIA VT8235 south bridge
 Main memory: 1× DDR SDRAM (PC2100 and PC1600)
 Miscellaneous:
 2× LAN
 1× LVDS connector

EPIA CN 

 Processor: 1× VIA C3 (1300MHz or 1000MHz)
 Chipset: VIA CN700 Northbridge + VIA VT8237R Southbridge
 VGA: VIA UniChromeTM Pro with MPEG-2 decoder
 Main memory: 1× DDR2-SDRAM, 533 MHz (up to 1 GB)
 Miscellaneous:
 2× Serial ATA
 1× S-Video
 1× RCA (for S/PDIF or Composite)
 1× LAN
 8× USB
 1× COM

EPIA M 

 Processor: 1× VIA C3 (1000 MHz) or 1× EDEN ESP (600 MHz)
 Chipset: VIA CLE266 north bridge + VIA VT8235 south bridge
 Main memory: 1× DDR SDRAM (PC2100 and PC1600)
 Miscellaneous:
 1× FDD connector
 LVDS connector
 1× S-Video
 1× RCA (for S/PDIF or Composite)

EPIA MII 

 Processor: 1× VIA C3 (1200 or 1000 MHz) or 1× EDEN ESP (600 MHz)
 Chipset: VIA CLE266 north bridge + VIA VT8235 south bridge
 Main memory: 1× DDR SDRAM (PC2100 and PC1600)
 Miscellaneous:
 1× FDD connector
 LVDS connector
 1× S-Video
 1× RCA (for S/PDIF or Composite)
 CardBus / CompactFlash slot
 1× FireWire (IEEE 1394)

EPIA ML 

 Processor: 1× VIA C3 (800 MHz) or 1× EDEN ESP (500 MHz)
 Chipset: VIA CLE266 north bridge + VIA VT8235 south bridge
 Main memory: 1× DDR SDRAM (PC2100 and PC1600)
 Miscellaneous: -

EPIA MS 

 Processor: 1× VIA C3 (1200 MHz) or 1× EDEN ESP (1000 or 800 MHz)
 Chipset: VIA CLE266 north bridge + VIA VT8237 south bridge
 Main memory: 1× DDR SDRAM (PC2100 and PC1600)
 Miscellaneous:
 CardBus / CompactFlash slot
 Most of the connections are implemented as plug strips

EPIA PD 

 Processor: 1× VIA C3 (1000 MHz) or 1× EDEN ESP (600 MHz)
 Chipset: VIA CLE266 north bridge + VIA VT8235 south bridge
 Main memory: 1× DDR-SDRAM (PC2100 and PC1600) max. 1 GB
 Miscellaneous:
 2× Local Area Network, 1x Via Rhine II + 1x Via Rhine III
 4× USB 2.0+ 2x USB optional
 1× COM external + 3× internal ports COM
 1× parallel
 1× 1x VIA/S3G CLE266 graphics onboard
 1× 1xPCI with extension card
 1× LVDS connector
 1× AC97 sound on board

EPIA SP 

 Processor: 1× VIA C3 (1300 MHz) or 1× EDEN ESP (800 MHz)
 Chipset: VIA CN400 north bridge + VIA VT8237 south bridge
 Main memory: 1× DDR SDRAM (PC3200, PC2700, PC2100 and PC1600)
 Miscellaneous:
 encryption unit
 2× Serial ATA
 1× FireWire IEEE 1394
 1× S-Video
 1× RCA (for S/PDIF or Composite)

EPIA TC 

 Processor: 1× VIA C3 (1000 MHz) or 1× EDEN ESP (600 MHz)
 Chipset: VIA CLE266 north bridge + VIA VT8235 south bridge
 Main memory: 1× DDR-SDRAM as SO-DIMM (PC2100 and PC1600)
 Miscellaneous:
 CardBus / CompactFlash slot
 1× LVDS connector
 direct connection to 12 V DC

EPIA V 

 Processor: 1× VIA C3 (800 MHz) or 1× EDEN ESP (500 MHz)
 Chipset: VIA PLE133T north bridge + VIA VT8231 south bridge
 Main memory: 2× SDR-SDRAM (PC100 and PC133)
 Miscellaneous: -

EPIA EX 

 Processor: 1× VIA C7 with 1500 MHz or 1000 MHz
 Chipset: VIA CX700M2
 VGA: UniChromeTM Pro II 3D/2D with MPEG-2/4 and WMV9 decoder
 Main memory: 1× DDR2 533 (up to 1 Gb)

VT-310DP 

 Processor: 2× EDEN ESP (1000 MHz or 800 MHz)
 Chipset: VIA CN400 Northbridge + VIA VT8237R Southbridge
 Main memory: 1× DDR SDRAM (PC3200, PC2700, PC2100 and PC1600)
 Miscellaneous:
 encryption unit
 2× Serial ATA
 3× LAN

References

External links
 VIA EPIA motherboards
 VIA EPIA EN12000E: Today's most efficient CPU & mainboard
 VIA EPIA ME6000 Mini ITX Review

Weblinks 

 http://www.viatech.com/ (English)
 http://www.via-tech.de/ (Deutsche)
 http://www.viaarena.com/ (English)
 http://www.Mini-ITX.com/ (English) ... do-it-yourself projects / information / news / shop

VIA Technologies
Motherboard
Embedded systems